Rineloricaria latirostris is a species of catfish in the family Loricariidae. It is native to South America, where it occurs in the upper Paraná River basin in Brazil. The species reaches 36 cm (14.2 inches) in total length and is believed to be a facultative air-breather.

References 

Loricariidae
Fish described in 1900
Catfish of South America
Fish of Brazil